Haploesthes is a North American genus of flowering plants in the family Asteraceae. It grows in Mexico and in the southwestern United States. They are perennial herbs or subshrubs with yellow flower heads.

The name is sometimes spelled Haploësthes, with two dots over the first e to indicate that the o and the e are to be pronounced in separate syllables. This is optional; either spelling is equally acceptable.

 Species
 Haploesthes fruticosa B.L.Turner - Coahuila, Nuevo León
 Haploesthes greggii A.Gray - Coahuila, Nuevo León, Texas, New Mexico, Oklahoma, Colorado, Kansas
Haploesthes hintoniana B.L.Turner
 Haploesthes robusta I.M.Johnst. - Coahuila

References

Tageteae
Asteraceae genera
Flora of North America
Taxa named by Asa Gray